Only Human is a 2004 Spanish-Argentine film directed by Dominic Harari and Teresa Pelegri.

Plot
A mismatched couple discovers that whatever can go wrong will go wrong during a family visit in this comedy.

Leni (Marian Aguilera) is a television reporter from a Jewish family in Spain. One weekend, Leni drops by her family's home for a visit, with her new boyfriend, college professor Rafi (Guillermo Toledo), in tow.

Rafi is more than a bit nervous about meeting Leni's family - chronically nervous mother Gloria (Norma Aleandro), blustery father Ernesto (Mario Martin), dance-student sister Tania (María Botto), strait-laced brother David (Fernando Ramallo), and addled grandfather Dudu (Max Berliner). But Leni quickly makes matters worse when she announces to her family, who are waiting for Ernesto to return from work, that Rafi just happens to be Palestinian. Matters become a bit tense after that as Rafi accidentally drops a block of frozen soup out the high rise window while joking with Tania's young daughter - hitting a man on the head who might just be Ernesto. He and Leni sneak outside to call an ambulance before returning inside because Leni doesn't want to ruin her career with such a scandal. But when Rafi sees Tania's daughter's drawing of Ernesto he realizes what he may have done. As tensions raise, the entire family becomes more and more exuberant, ending with Leni telling her mother of Tania's suspicion that Ernesto is cheating on her. At this point Rafi finally manages to tell Leni he think the man was her father so that Gloria, Tania, Rafi and Leni all rush out of the building to Ernesto's office to try and catch him in the act (Rafi all the while hoping he's wrong). We see that Ernesto was not actually dead and he wakes up with some memory loss, leading him to believe that a prostitute is his wife who quickly throws him out when she realizes he has no money. Ernesto continues to wander hopelessly. The family meanwhile arrives at his office only to find another bald man having an affair who tells them Ernesto already left. As Tania and Rafi wait for Leni and Gloria who are having a mother-daughter conversation, Tania seduces Rafi with a dance to a song he knows. She kisses him but he rejects her. When they return, Leni is convinced that Tania slept with him which leads Tania to finally cast off her apparent apathetic view of the family. Everyone leaves the office reconciled and upon their return home, Ernesto is driven up by a woman on a scooter who found him wandering the streets and the family is whole again.

Cast
 Guillermo Toledo as Rafi
 Marián Aguilera as Leni Dali
 María Botto as Tania Dali
 Fernando Ramallo as David Dalenski
 Norma Aleandro as Gloria Dali
 Alba Molinero as Paula Dali
 Max Berliner as Dudu Dali
 Mario Martín as Ernesto Dali

Awards
The film was awarded at film festivals:

in 2005:
 Monte-Carlo Comedy Film Festival: Best Film; Best Screenplay.
in 2005:
 Alpe d'Huez International Comedy Film Festival: Grand Prix;
 Jerusalem Film Festival: Mayors' Award, Best Feature on The Jewish Experience;
 Jewish Motifs International Film Festival in Warsaw, Poland: Warsaw Phoenix (silver statuette) for the best feature film.
Nominations
 Goya Awards: Goya, Best Make-Up and Hairstyles (Mejor Maquillaje y/o Peluquería); 2005.

See also
 A Trumpet in the Wadi

External links 
 official website: 
 

2004 films
Argentine independent films
2004 comedy films
2000s Spanish-language films
Spanish independent films
2000s Spanish films
2000s Argentine films